Elmi is a name which can serve as a given name and as a surname.

Notable people with the given name:
Elmi Roble Warfa (died 1934), Somali King of the Gadabuursi's
Elmi Ahmed Duale (born 1935), Somali physician, diplomat and politician
Elmi Boodhari (born 1908), Somaliland poet
Elmi Muller, South African medical specialist and President of the Southern African Transplantation Society 
Elmi Duale, Somali diplomat
Elmi Hassan, apprentice baker, Norway Kolonihagen Bakeri

Notable people with the surname:
Abdiwahid Elmi Gonjeh, Somali politician
Adan Ahmed Elmi (born 1966), Minister of Agriculture of Somaliland
Abdiaziz Nur Elmi Koor, Somali politician
Ahmed Elmi Osman, Somali politician
Aidin Elmi (born 1986), Indonesian footballer
Asha Haji Elmi (born 1962), Somali politician and peace activist
Ayan Elmi (born 1988 or 1989), Somali model
Dahir Adan Elmi, Somali military general
Guido Elmi (born 1935), Italian former swimmer
Idiris Muse Elmi (died 2010), Somali politician
Iidle Elmi (born 1995), Somalian born Finnish footballer
Maria Giovanna Elmi (born 1940), Italian former television announcer, presenter, journalist, actress and singer
Mohamed Ibrahim Elmi, Kenyan politician
Yacin Elmi Bouh (born 1962), Djiboutian politician

References